WMLScript is a procedural programming language and dialect of JavaScript used for WML pages and is part of the Wireless Application Protocol (WAP).

WMLScript is a client-side scripting language and is similar to JavaScript. Just like JavaScript WMLScript is used for tasks such as user input validation, generation of error message and other Dialog boxes etc.

WMLScript is based on ECMAScript (European Computer Manufacturers Association Script), which is JavaScript's standardized version. Thus the syntax of WMLScript is similar to JavaScript but not fully compatible.

Despite the syntactical similarities, they are two different languages.  WMLScript does not have objects or array, which JavaScript has.  On the other hand, it allows you to declare and include external functions from other scripts.   WMLScript is optimised for low power  and is a compiled language.

References

Open Mobile Alliance standards
Scripting languages
Mobile software